The ahenk is a fretless stringed instrument from Turkey, invented by Süleyman Suat Sezgin in 1929. It was designed to be played like the oud. The instrument is similar to a banjo; like the banjo it uses has a reflector bowl as a resonator. On the ahenk, the bowl is made of wood. The front resembles a banjo, with a bridge between the strings and a skin head, similar to that used on a kanun. The skin head does not cover the whole front of the instrument, instead the instrument has a wooden front with a hole for the skin, and two or more sound holes.  It is similar to the Cumbus by having an adjustable neck, adjusted by turning a wing-nut.

Unlike the Cumbus, another Turkish banjo invented in the early 20th century, the instrument has nearly disappeared. There is a renewed interest in the instrument, which is being built in Istanbul and in Eskişehir (where it was invented).

References

See also
Photo of an ahenk.
 Stringed Instrument Database
 Pictures of the Ahenk
 The Stringed Instrument Database
 ATLAS of Plucked Instruments; there is a picture of the Ahenk under the instrument "cümbüs."
 Site in Turkish about the creation of the instrument
Website about the Ahenk with pictures.

String instruments
Turkish musical instruments
Turkish inventions
Turkish words and phrases